Martin Parr  (born 23 May 1952) is a British documentary photographer, photojournalist and photobook collector. He is known for his photographic projects that take an intimate, satirical and anthropological look at aspects of modern life, in particular documenting the social classes of England, and more broadly the wealth of the Western world.

His major projects have been rural communities (1975–1982), The Last Resort (1983–1985), The Cost of Living (1987–1989), Small World (1987–1994) and Common Sense (1995–1999).

Since 1994, Parr has been a member of Magnum Photos. He has had around 40 solo photobooks published, and has featured in around 80 exhibitions worldwide – including the international touring exhibition ParrWorld, and a retrospective at the Barbican Arts Centre, London, in 2002.

The Martin Parr Foundation, founded in 2014, and registered as a charity in 2015 opened premises in his hometown of Bristol in 2017. It houses his own archive, his collection of British and Irish photography by other photographers, and a gallery.

Life and career

Personal life
Born in Epsom, Surrey, Parr wanted to become a documentary photographer from the age of fourteen. He cites his grandfather, George Parr, an amateur photographer and fellow of the Royal Photographic Society, as an early influence. He married Susan Mitchell and they have one child, Ellen Parr (born 1986). Parr was diagnosed with cancer in May 2021.

Photographer
Parr has said of his photography:
The fundamental thing I'm exploring constantly is the difference between the mythology of the place and the reality of it. ... Remember I make serious photographs disguised as entertainment. That's part of my mantra. I make the pictures acceptable to find the audience but deep down there is actually a lot going on that's not sharply written in your face. If you want to read it you can read it.

Parr's aesthetic is close-up, through use of a macro lens, and employing saturated colour, a result of either the type of film and/or use of a ring flash. This allows him to put his subjects "under the microscope" in their own environment, giving them space to expose their lives and values in ways that often involve inadvertent humour. His technique, as seen in his book Signs of the Times: A Portrait of the Nation's Tastes (1992), has been said to leave viewers with ambiguous emotional reactions, unsure whether to laugh or cry.

Manchester Polytechnic, 1970–1973
Parr studied photography at Manchester Polytechnic from 1970 to 1972 with contemporaries Daniel Meadows and Brian Griffin. Parr and Meadows collaborated on various projects, including working at Butlin's as roving photographers. They were part of a new wave of documentary photographers, "a loose British grouping, which, though it never gave itself a title have become variously known as 'the Young British Photographers', 'Independent Photographers' and the 'New British Photography'."

Rural communities, West Yorkshire, Greater Manchester and Ireland, 1975–1982
In 1975 Parr moved to Hebden Bridge in West Yorkshire where he would complete his first mature work. He was involved with the Albert Street Workshop, a hub for artistic activity which included a darkroom and exhibition space. Parr spent five years photographing rural life in the area, focusing on the Methodist (and some Baptist) non-conformist chapels, a focal point for isolated farming communities that in the early 1970s were closing down. He photographed in black-and-white, for its nostalgic nature and for it being appropriate to his celebratory look at this past activity. Also, photographers at that time were obliged to work in black-and-white to be taken seriously, colour being associated with commercial and snapshot photography. His series The Non-Conformists was widely exhibited at the time and published as a book in 2013. Critic Sean O'Hagan, writing in The Guardian, said "It's easy to forget how quietly observational Parr was as a black-and-white photographer."

In 1980 Parr married Susan Mitchell and, for her work, they moved to the west coast of Ireland. He set up a darkroom in Boyle, County Roscommon.

Parr's first publications, Bad Weather, published in 1982 by Zwemmer with an Arts Council subsidy, Calderdale Photographs (1984) and A Fair Day: Photographs from the West Coast of Ireland (1984), all featured photographs from mostly northern England, and Ireland, in black-and-white. He used a Leica M3 with a 35 mm lens; although for Bad Weather he quickly switched to an underwater camera with a flashgun.

The working class, The Last Resort, 1982–1985
In 1982 Parr and his wife moved to Wallasey, England, and he switched permanently to colour photography, inspired by the work of US colour photographers, mostly Joel Meyerowitz, but also William Eggleston and Stephen Shore, and also the British Peter Fraser and Peter Mitchell. Parr has written that "I had also encountered the post cards of John Hinde when I worked at Butlin's in the early 70s and the bright saturated colour of these had a big impact on me." During the summers of 1983, 1984 and 1985 he photographed working-class people at the seaside in nearby New Brighton. This work was published in the book The Last Resort: Photographs of New Brighton (1986) and exhibited in Liverpool and London.

Although John Bulmer had pioneered colour documentary photography of Britain, from 1965, Gerry Badger has said of The Last Resort:
It is difficult from a perspective of almost a quarter of a century to underestimate [sic] the significance of The Last Resort, either in British photography or Martin Parr's career. For both, it represented a seismic change in the basic mode of photographic expression, from monochrome to colour, a fundamental technical change that heralded the development of a new tone in documentary photography.

Karen Wright, writing in The Independent, has said "He was attacked by some critics for his scrutiny of the working classes, but looking at these works, one merely sees Parr's unflinching eye capturing the truth of a social class embracing leisure in whatever form available."

The middle class, The Cost of Living (1987–1989)
In 1985 Parr completed a commission for the Documentary Photography Archive in Manchester to photograph people at supermarkets in Salford, Retailing in the Borough of Salford, which is now held at the archive.

He and his wife moved to Bristol in 1987, where they still live. During 1987 and 1988 he completed his next major project, on the middle class, who were at that time becoming increasingly affluent under Thatcherism. He photographed middle-class activities such as shopping, dinner parties and school open days, predominantly around Bristol and Bath in the southwest of England. It was published as his next book The Cost of Living (1989) and exhibited in Bath, London, Oxford and Paris.

His book One Day Trip (1989) featured photographs taken when he accompanied people on a booze cruise to France, a commission from Mission Photographique Transmanche.

Mass tourism, Small World (1987–1994)

Between 1987 and 1994 Parr travelled internationally to make his next major series, a critique of mass tourism, published as Small World in 1995. A revised edition with additional photographs was published in 2007. It was exhibited in 1995–1996 in London, Paris, Edinburgh, and Palma in Spain and has continued to be shown in various locations since.

He was visiting professor of photography at the University of Art and Design in Helsinki between 1990 and 1992.

Global consumerism, Common Sense (1995–1999)

Between 1995 and 1999 Parr made the series Common Sense about global consumerism. Common Sense was an exhibition of 350 prints, and a book published in 1999 with 158 images. The exhibition was first shown in 1999 and was staged simultaneously in forty-one venues in seventeen countries. The pictures depict the minutiae of consumer culture, and are intended to show the ways in which people entertain themselves. The photographs were taken with 35 mm ultra-saturated film for its vivid, heightened colours.

Magnum Photos
Parr joined Magnum Photos as an associate member in 1988. The vote on his inclusion as a full member in 1994 was divisive, with Philip Jones Griffiths circulating a plea to other members not to admit him. Parr achieved the necessary two-thirds majority by one vote. Magnum membership helped him work on editorial photography, and on editorial fashion photography for Paul Smith, Louis Vuitton, Galerie du jour Agnès B. and Madame Figaro.

In 2014 Parr was voted in as president of Magnum Photos International, a post he held for 3.5 years until 2017.

Collector

Photobooks
Parr is a collector and critic of photobooks. His collaboration with the critic Gerry Badger, The Photobook: A History (in three volumes) covers more than 1,000 examples of photobooks from the 19th century through to the present day. The first two volumes took eight years to complete. Tate Modern's retrospective exhibition of Daido Moriyama in London included many Moriyama books loaned from Parr displayed in vitrines.

Other items
Parr also collects postcards, photographs and various other items of vernacular and popular culture such as wallpaper, Saddam Hussein watches and prostitute advertising cards from phoneboxes (items with a photograph on them). Here too, items from his collections have been used as the basis for publications and exhibitions. Since the 1970s, Parr has collected and publicised the garish postcards made between the 1950s and 1970s by John Hinde and his team of photographers.

Curator
Parr was guest artistic director for the 2004 Rencontres d'Arles festival of photography, guest curator of the New Typologies exhibition at the 2008 New York Photo Festival, and guest curator of Brighton Photo Biennial in 2010, which he called New Documents. Critic Sean O'Hagan, writing in The Guardian, said "Back in 2004, he was invited by the organisers of the annual Rencontres D'Arles to be guest curator. That year's Arles festival, in its range and ambition, remains the standard by which all subsequent Rencontres have been judged."

Parr was artistic director of the newly established Bristol Photo Festival, scheduled to open in 2021. However in July 2020 he quit, due to his involvement with a 2018 reissue of the photobook London by Gian Butturini, after a campaign by an anthropology student at University College London, who called a pairing of photographs in it racist.

Film and television
Parr has been involved in making television, and documentary and other films.

From 1990 to 1992 Parr collaborated with Nick Barker, taking photographs to accompany Barker's film Signs of the Times.

In 1997, Parr began producing his own television documentaries with Mosaic Film.

In 2003 Parr was the subject of and appeared extensively in the Imagine BBC One TV series episode The World According to Parr, directed and produced by Rebecca Frayn, and hosted and executive produced by Alan Yentob.

He was cameraman on the film It's Nice Up North (2006) with comedian Graham Fellows (as his character John Shuttleworth). The film is a comic documentary filmed over several years in Shetland.

In 2007 Parr took part in BBC Four's The Genius of Photography, a six-part documentary series exploring the history of photography. In 2008 he was one of three judges on the Channel 4 series Picture This.

In 2014 Parr created "Turkey and Tinsel", a 60-minute deadpan and often hilarious observational video documentary about faux Christmas in small town England.

Teaching
Parr was a visiting lecturer at West Surrey College of Art & Design (now University for the Creative Arts) in Farnham, Surrey. In 2004 he was appointed professor of photography at the University of Wales, Newport. In 2013 he was appointed professor of photography at Ulster University in Belfast.

Martin Parr Foundation
The Martin Parr Foundation was founded in 2014. It opened premises in Bristol in October 2017. The Foundation houses Parr's own archive, and his collection of prints and book dummies made by other photographers—mainly British and Irish photography, and work by several photographers from abroad who have photographed in the UK. There is a gallery open to the public—its first exhibition was Parr's Black Country Stories—and it is a hub for talks, screenings and events. The Foundation is located in Paintworks in south East Bristol. Parr is the Foundation's main source of income.

Reception
The German photographic curator Thomas Weski has said:
Martin Parr is a chronicler of our age... Leisure, consumption and communication are the concepts that this British photographer has been researching for several decades now on his worldwide travels... Parr enables us to see things that have seemed familiar to us in a completely new way.

Dan Rule, writing in The Age, has said:
Parr's signature is his ability not only to isolate the most evocative of human details, but to elevate such visual fragments to that of the wider societal signpost or glyph.

Honours and awards
 2004: Professor of photography, University of Wales, Newport.
 2005: Honorary Fellow of the Royal Photographic Society (HonFRPS), Royal Photographic Society, Bath, UK.
 2006: Honorary Masters Degree, University for the Creative Arts
 2006: Dr. Erich Salomon Award, Germany
 2008: Centenary Medal, Royal Photographic Society, Bath, UK.
 2008: Doctor of Arts, honorary degree, Manchester Metropolitan University (MMU), in recognition for his ongoing contribution to photography and to the MMU School of Art.
 2008: Lifetime Achievement Award, PHotoEspaña.
 2008: International Award from the Photographic Society of Japan.
 2014: Exceptional Achievement in Photography, Amateur Photographer, London.
 2014: Lucie Award, Achievement in Documentary Photography, Lucie Foundation.
 2016: Recognition for Significant Contribution in the Field of Visual Arts, Royal Academy of Arts, London.
 2017: Outstanding Contribution to Photography prize, World Photography Organisation.

Parr was appointed Commander of the Order of the British Empire (CBE) in the 2021 Birthday Honours for services to photography.

Publications

Monographs

Early Works. Bristol: RRB, 2019.
 Paris: Maison CF, 2019. French-language version. 
A Year in the Life of Chew Stoke Village. Photographs by Martin Parr Bristol: RRB PhotoBooks, 2022.
Chew Stoke Paris: Maison CF, 2022. . French-language version.

Retrospectives, private publications, and very limited publications

Papers and zines

Postcards
Home and Abroad. London: British Council, 1994. . A set of postcards, as the catalogue of a travelling exhibition. Text by Brett Rogers. Not to be confused with the book of the same title.
Love Cube. [Stockholm]: Gun Gallery, 2007. . Twenty-seven cards in a box, with a booklet. Photographs by Parr, text by Johan Croneman.
 Royal Wedding. Paris: Verlhac, 2011. . Set of 10 postcards inside small album. Text (in French) by Stéphane Bern.
 Royal Jubilee. Set of 10 postcards inside small album.
 London: Pavilion, 2012. . Text (in English) by Stéphane Bern.
 Paris: Verlhac, 2012. . French-language version. Text (in French) by Stéphane Bern.

Books with others

Books edited or with contributions by Parr

Tony Ray-Jones. Paris: Maison CF, 2019. . Photographs by Tony Ray-Jones. Edited and introduced by Martin Parr.

Books about Parr
These also include photographs by Parr.
Martin Parr by Val Williams.
London: Phaidon, 2002. . Hardback.
Martin Parr. Rome: Contrasto, 2002. . Italian-language version.
Berlin: Phaidon, 2008. . German-language version.
London: Phaidon, 2004. . Paperback.
2nd ed. London: Phaidon, 2014. .
Martin Parr vu par.... Bonsecours, France: Édition Point de vues, 2005. By children; in French.
Martin Parr by Sandra S. Phillips.
Phaidon 55. London: Phaidon, 2007. .
Paris: Phaidon, 2007. . French-language edition.
London: Phaidon, 2013.
Martin Parr, text by Alessandra Mauro.
I Grandi Fotografi: Magnum Photos. Testimonianze e visioni del nostro tempo. Milan: Hachette Fascicoli, 2005. . In Italian.
Grandes fotográfos Magnum Photos 20. [Barcelona]: Salvat [2007]. . In Spanish.

Exhibitions

1972: Butlins by the Sea (with Daniel Meadows), Impressions Gallery, York, UK.
1974: Home Sweet Home, Impressions Gallery, York, UK.
1977: Hebden Bridge and Beauty Spots, The Photographers' Gallery, London.
1989–1991: The Cost of Living, Royal Photographic Society, Bath, 1989/1990; The Photographers' Gallery, London, 1990; Museum of Modern Art, Oxford, 1990; Gallery Jacques Gordat, Paris, 1991.
2002–2005: Retrospective, Martin Parr Photoworks 1971 – 2000, Barbican Arts Centre, London, 2002; National Museum of Photography, Film, and Television, Bradford, 2002; Kunsthal, Rotterdam, The Netherlands, 2003; Museo Nacional Centro de Arte Reina Sofía, Madrid, 2003; National Museum of Photography, Copenhagen, 2003; Deichtorhallen, Hamburg, 2004. Works 1971–2001, Maison européenne de la photographie, Paris, 2005. Curated by Val Williams and organized by Brigitte Lardinois. Photographs from the 1970s–2001, from the series Butlins by the Sea, June Street, Home Sweet Home, The Last Resort, The Cost of Living, Small World and Autoportraits.
2007: Retrospective, Month of Photography Asia, Singapore. Parr's exhibition was the main show.
2008/2009: ParrWorld, touring exhibition, Haus der Kunst, Munich, 2008; Graphic Design Museum, Breda, Netherlands, 2008; Galerie nationale du Jeu de Paume, Paris, 2009; Baltic Centre for Contemporary Art, Gateshead, UK, 2009.
2013/2014: Only in England: Photographs by Tony Ray-Jones and Martin Parr, Media Space, Science Museum, London, September 2013 – March 2014; National Media Museum, Bradford, March–June 2014; Walker Art Gallery, Liverpool, February–June 2015. With Parr's The Non-Conformists and material from the National Media Museum's Tony Ray-Jones archive, curated by Parr and Greg Hobson.
2014: Black Country Stories, New Art Gallery, Walsall and Wolverhampton Art Gallery. Commissioned by Multistory, Parr photographed the four boroughs of the Black Country, documenting the traditions and communities that live there. This work produced the photobook, Martin Parr: Black Country Stories (2014), along with four films, including Teddy Gray's Sweet Factory (2011).
2014: Paris, Maison Européenne de la Photographie, Paris
2017: Sony World Photography Awards & Martin Parr – 2017 Exhibition, Somerset House, London. Three rooms dedicated to Parr, with "black and white images from his early career, alongside some of the artist's most talked about work, books and films and original exhibition posters." Also shown were a "selection of the winning, shortlisted and commended work from the World Photography Organisation's annual photography competi[ti]on."
2018: Only Human: Photographs by Martin Parr. National Portrait Gallery, London.

2019: In Black & White: Martin Parr & Tony Ray-Jones. Galerie Clémentine de la Féronnière, Paris.
2022-2023 : Henri Cartier-Bresson with Martin Parr - Reconciliation, Fondation Henri Cartier-Bresson, Paris.

Films
It's Nice Up North (2006) – cameraman

Collections
Parr's work is held in the following permanent collections:
Art Institute of Chicago, Chicago, Illinois
Victoria and Albert Museum, London
Tate, London

See also
 Paul Reas
 Anna Fox
 Paul Graham
 Tony Ray-Jones
 Tom Wood
 Chris Killip

Notes

References

External links

 
 Martin Parr Agent: DMB Represents, includes photographs and latest projects on the freshly made section.

 Martin Parr at Magnum Photos, includes many of his photographs
 'The World According To Parr', Imagine series, with Alan Yentob, season 2, episode 4 (video)
 Martin Parr: Mischievous Ironist – interview with Jim Casper (audio)
 Interview with Martin Parr from 'Tous Photographes!'
 'Contacts Vol3 Martin Parr' (video)
 'TateShots: Martin Parr, studio visit – Martin Parr on Photographing Britain' (video)

1952 births
Living people
People from Epsom
20th-century photographers
Alumni of Manchester Metropolitan University
Magnum photographers
English photojournalists
Street photographers
Social documentary photographers
English book and manuscript collectors
Photography academics
Photography critics
Photography curators
English contemporary artists
Alumni of Ulster University
Royal Photographic Society members
Deltiologists
Commanders of the Order of the British Empire
Photography museums and galleries in England
20th-century English artists
21st-century English artists
21st-century photographers
Academics of the University of Wales